Abdisamad Ali Shire Abdisamad Ali Shire is a former Vice President of Puntland.  From January 08, 2009 to January 08, 2014, he also served as Somali military service.

Personal life
Shire was born in Taleh, situated in the Sool region. He is from the Dhulbahante sub-division of the Harti Darod clan.

Vice president of Puntland (madaxweyne ku xigeen-ka Puntland)

Vice President of Puntland (Madaxweyne ku xigeen-kii Puntland)

Garowe Principles
In February 2012, Shire and other Somali government officials met in Garowe, Puntland's administrative capital, to discuss post-transition arrangements following the end of the Transitional Federal Government (TFG)'s mandate in August 2012. After extensive deliberations attended by regional actors and international observers, the conference ended in a signed agreement between Puntland President Abdirahman Mohamud Farole, TFG President Sharif Sheikh Ahmed, Prime Minister Abdiweli Mohamed Ali, Speaker of Parliament Sharif Hassan Sheikh Aden, Galmudug President Mohamed Ahmed Alim and Ahlu Sunna Waljama'a representative Khalif Abdulkadir Noor stipulating that: a) a new 225 member bicameral parliament would be formed, consisting of an upper house seating 54 Senators as well as a lower house; b) 30% of the National Constituent Assembly (NCA) is earmarked for women; c) the President is to be appointed via a constitutional election; and d) the Prime Minister is selected by the President and he/she then names his/her Cabinet. The agreements were known as the Garowe Principles. On 23 June 2012, the Somali federal and regional leaders met again and approved a draft constitution after several days of deliberation. The National Constituent Assembly overwhelmingly passed the new constitution on 1 August, with 96% voting for it, 2% against it, and 2% abstaining.

Horseed 
On 14 November 2012, President Farole announced the launching of his new political party, Horseed. The association counted over 200 members and represented the incumbent Puntland government, including Vice President Shire and the state Ministers. It was the first prospective party to register for an application with the Transitional Puntland Electoral Commission (TPEC).

Puntland presidential election (2014)
In 2013, Shire ran for a second term as Vice President of the autonomous Puntland state in the northeastern region's 2014 elections. He lost out to Abdihakim Abdullahi Haji Omar.

Death
On 20 May 2021, Shire died in Mogadishu. former vice President of Puntland Abdisamad Ali Shire has been buried in the Puntland capital of Garoowe by the President of Puntland Said Abdullahi Deni attended his Funeral.

See also
Abdirahman Mohamud Farole

References

Vice presidents of Puntland
Puntland politicians
Year of birth missing (living people)